"One More Heartache" is a 1966 single recorded by Marvin Gaye for Motown Records' Tamla label. The single was written by the team of The Miracles members Bobby Rogers, Marv Tarplin, Pete Moore, Ronnie White and Smokey Robinson and produced by Robinson. The song was the third release and third consecutive Top 40 single from Gaye's Moods of Marvin Gaye album, and was produced with a similar sound to his hit "Ain't That Peculiar". "One More Heartache"was a Top 30 Pop hit, peaking at number 29 on the Billboard Hot 100, and a Top 10 R&B hit, peaking at number four on the US Billboard R&B chart.

Billboard described the song as having "a driving, infectious beat and an exciting Gaye vocal."  Cash Box described the single as a "rhythmic, chorus-backed lament about a guy who feels that if his gal hurts him again it will be the straw that breaks the camel’s back."

Cover versions
 A cover by the Butterfield Blues Band was released on their album The Resurrection of Pigboy Crabshaw in 1967. It was on the B side of the single of "Run Out Of Time" that was released as a teaser for the album.

Credits
Lead vocals by Marvin Gaye
Background vocals by The Andantes: Jackie Hicks, Marlene Barrow & Louvain Demps
Guitar by Marv Tarplin
Other instrumentation by The Funk Brothers

References

1966 singles
Marvin Gaye songs
Songs written by Warren "Pete" Moore
Songs written by Bobby Rogers
Songs written by Smokey Robinson
Songs written by Marv Tarplin
Songs written by Ronald White
Tamla Records singles
Song recordings produced by Smokey Robinson